The Statute of Frauds Amendment Act 1828 (9 Geo 4 c 14), commonly known as Lord Tenterden's Act, was an Act of the Parliament of the United Kingdom. Lord Tenterden served as Lord Chief Justice of the King's Bench between 1818 and 1832. Its purpose was for "rendering a written Memorandum necessary to the Validity of certain Promises and Engagements".

History
The Act received royal assent on 9 May 1828. It Act was adopted in New South Wales by the Act 4 Will 4 No 17 (1834), and extended to the territories of the East India Company by Act No XIV of 1840.

Sections 1 to 4, so far as they related to personal actions or actions of ejectment in the Superior Courts of Law in Ireland, were repealed by section 3 of, and Schedule A to, the Common Law Procedure Amendment Act (Ireland) 1853 (16 & 17 Vict c 113), subject to the exceptions in section 3 of that Act.

Contents

Preamble
The preamble said that by Limitation Act 1623 and a similar Act passed in Ireland, namely the Act 10 Cha 1 Sess 2 c 6 (I) (1634), various questions have arisen in actions founded on simple contract, as to the proof and effect of acknowledgments and promises offered in evidence for the purpose of taking cases out of the operation of these Acts; and it is expedient to prevent such questions, and to make provision for giving effect to the said Acts and to the intention thereof.

The preamble was omitted by the Statute Law Revision Act 1890.

Section 1
Section 1 provided that in actions of debt or upon the case grounded upon any simple contract no oral acknowledgment or promise shall be deemed sufficient evidence of a new or continuing contract, whereby to take any case out of the operation of the above Acts, or to deprive any party of the benefit thereof, unless such acknowledgment or promise shall be in some writing signed by the party chargeable thereby; and that where there shall be two or more joint contractors, no such joint contractor shall lose the benefit of the above Acts, so as to be chargeable in respect or by reason only of any written acknowledgment or promise made and signed by any other of them, and that nothing in this section shall alter or take away or lessen the effect of any payment of any principal or interest made by any person, and that in actions to be commenced against two or more such joint contractors, if it shall appear that the plaintiff, though barred by either of the above Acts or this Act, as to one or more of such joint contractors, shall nevertheless be entitled to recover against any other or others of the defendants, by virtue of a new acknowledgment or promise, judgment may be given the plaintiff as to such defendants against whom he shall recover, and for the other defendants against the plaintiff.

This section was repealed by the Schedule to the Limitation Act 1939.

Section 2
Section 2 provided that if any defendant in any action on any simple contract shall make a plea in abatement, to the effect that any other person ought to be jointly sued, and it shall appear that the action could not, by reason of the said above Acts or this Act be maintained against the other person named in such plea, the issue joined on such plea shall be found against the party pleading.

This section was repealed as to the Supreme Court of Judicature in England by section 2 of, and Part II of the Schedule to, the Civil Procedure Acts Repeal Act 1879. This section was repealed as to England and Wales by section 4 of the Statute Law Revision and Civil Procedure Act 1883.

This section was repealed by the Statute Law Revision Act 1890.

Section 3
That no indorsement or memorandum of any payment written or made upon any promissory note, bill of exchange, or other writing, by the party to whom such payment shall be made, shall be deemed sufficient proof of such payment, so as to take the case out of the operation the above Acts.

This section was repealed by the Schedule to the Limitation Act 1939.

Section 4
This section provided that the above Acts and this Act shall apply in case of debt or simple contract asserted as a defense of set-off.

This section was repealed by the Schedule to the Limitation Act 1939.

Section 5
This section provided that no action shall be maintained upon any promise made after full age to pay any debt contracted during infancy, or upon any ratification after full age of any contract made during infancy, unless made by writing signed by the party to be charged.

This section was repealed by the Statute Law Revision Act 1875, because it was virtually repealed or superseded by section 2 of the Infants Relief Act 1874 (37 & 38 Vict c 62).

Section 6
This section was enacted to prevent section 4 of the Statute of Frauds being circumvented bringing an action for the tort of deceit (the tort in Freeman v Palsey), by requiring the representation of credit be in writing signed by the party charged. In the 2007 Court of Appeal case of Contex Drouzhba Ltd v Wiseman, the question was considered of whether the signature of a company director, fraudulently placed on a document on behalf of the company, was also the personal signature of the director, so as to be "the signature by the party to be charged" in accordance with the wording of this section, signed by the party to be charged therewith. Mr Wiseman, the defendant, argued that his signing the document constituted "writing" on behalf of the company but in regard to his personal liability it was "conduct", insufficient to be treated as "writing, signed by the party to be charged". The judges dismissed Mr Wiseman's appeal, finding that "Mr Wiseman made a fraudulent representation in writing as to the credit or ability" of the company.

Section 7
This section provided that the Statute of Frauds relating to contract for the sale of goods for the price of ten pounds sterling or more shall cover goods to be delivered in the future, not yet manufactured, or not yet fit for delivery. It is also applicable to the Statute of Frauds 1695 in Ireland.

This section was repealed by the Schedule to the Sale of Goods Act 1893.

Section 8
This section provided that writings required by this Act were not agreement subject to stamp duty.

This section was repealed by the Schedule to the Limitation Act 1939.

Section 9
This section provides that this Act shall not extend to Scotland.

Section 10
This section provided that this Act commenced and took effect on 1 January 1829.

This section was repealed by section 1 of, and the Schedule to, the Statute Law Revision Act 1873.

See also
Statute of frauds
Limitation Act 1623
Statute of Frauds

References

Further reading
Samuel Martin. A Treatise on the Act 9 Geo. IV. Cap. 14. commonly called Lord Tenterden's Act, entitled, "An Act for rendering a written Memorandum necesssary to the Validity of certain Promises and Engagements". Saunders and Benning. Fleet Street, London. 1829. Google Books.
"Statute of Frauds Amendment Act 1828". Halsbury's Statutes of England and Wales. Fourth Edition. 2010 Reissue. LexisNexis. Volume 11(1). Page 439.
Halsbury's Statutes of England. Third Edition. Butterworths. London. 1969. Volume 7. Page 7.
"The Statute of Frauds Amendment Act, 1828". Halsbury's Statutes of England. First Edition. Butterworth & Co (Publishers) Ltd. Bell Yard, Temple Bar, London. 1929. Volume 10:  . Page 439. See also page 426. Volume 3. Page 584.
John Mounteney Lely. "Lord Tenterden's Act, 1828". The Statutes of Practical Utility. (Chitty's Statutes). Fifth Edition. Sweet and Maxwell. Stevens and Sons. London. 1894. Volume 4. Title "Frauds". Pages 24 to 26. 1895. Volume 6. Title "Limitation". Pages 13 to 19.
Joseph Chitty. A Collection of Statutes of Practical Utility with Notes thereon. William Benning. Fleet Street, London. 1829. Volume 1, Part 2. Title "Limitations, Statutes of". Pages 709, 710, 878 and 879.
"The Statute of Frauds Amendment Act 1828 (Imp.)". Reprinted Statutes of New Zealand. 1979. Volume 30. Page 231.
Joshua Williams. Principles of the Law of Personal Property. Sixth Edition. H Sweet. London. 1866. Pages 79 to 81.

External links
The Statute of Frauds Amendment Act 1828, as amended, from Legislation.gov.uk.
The Statute of Frauds Amendment Act 1828, as originally enacted, from Legislation.gov.uk.

United Kingdom Acts of Parliament 1828
English contract law